Shahadat Hossain is a Jatiya Party (Ershad) politician and a former Jatiya Sangsad member representing the Satkhira-4 constituency during  1996–2001.

Career
Hossain was elected to the parliament from Satkhira-4 as a Jatiya Party candidate in 1996. He is a former vice-president of Jatiya Party. He was expelled from the party in 2009.

References

Living people
Jatiya Party politicians
7th Jatiya Sangsad members
Year of birth missing (living people)